The 2002 Southampton Council election took place on 2 May 2002 to elect members of Southampton Unitary Council in Hampshire, England. The whole council was up for election with boundary changes since the last election in 2000 increasing the number of seat by 3. The council stayed under no overall control.

Election result
The results saw no party win a majority on the council, with Labour just remaining the largest party. The Conservatives gained 4 seats, but the Conservative group leader, Conor Burns, lost his seat. Burns came fourth in Bassett ward behind his two party colleagues and Liberal Democrat Elizabeth Mizon.

Ward results

Bargate

Bassett

Bevois

Bitterne

Bitterne Park

Coxford

Freemantle

Harefield

Millbrook

Peartree

Portswood

Redbridge

Shirley

Sholing

Swaythling

Woolston

References

2002 English local elections
2002
2000s in Southampton